In enzymology,  viomycin kinase is an enzyme that catalyzes the chemical reaction

ATP + viomycin  ADP + O-phosphoviomycin

Thus, the two substrates of this enzyme are ATP and viomycin, whereas its two products are ADP and O-phosphoviomycin.

This enzyme belongs to the family of transferases, specifically those transferring phosphorus-containing groups (phosphotransferases) with an alcohol group as acceptor.  The systematic name of this enzyme class is ATP:viomycin O-phosphotransferase. Other names in common use include viomycin phosphotransferase, and capreomycin phosphotransferase.

References

 

EC 2.7.1
Enzymes of unknown structure